Somatic psychology is a form of psychotherapy that focuses on somatic experience, including therapeutic and holistic approaches to the body. Body psychotherapy is a general branch of this subject, while somatherapy, eco-somatics and dance therapy, for example, are specific branches of the subject. Somatic psychology is a framework that seeks to bridge the mind-body dichotomy.

Pierre Janet can perhaps be considered the first somatic psychologist due to his extensive psychotherapeutic studies and writings with significant reference to the body (some of which pre-date Freud). According to psychodynamic psychology, it is only gradually that the body entered into the realm of available techniques that could be used in a psychodynamic frame. This idea was, in part, developed by Sándor Ferenczi and his friend Georg Groddeck, then Otto Fenichel and his friend Wilhelm Reich. Wilhelm Reich is the first who tried to develop a clear psychodynamic approach that included the body, but he soon found out that it could not be done. He then developed his own way of combining body and mind and the somatic regulators that connect these two dimensions. Reich was a significant influence in the founding of body psychotherapy (or somatic psychology as it is often known in the USA and Australia) - though he called his early work "character analysis" and "character-analytic vegetotherapy"). Several types of body-oriented psychotherapies trace their origins back to Reich, though there have been many subsequent developments and other influences on body psychotherapy and somatic psychology is of particular interest in trauma work.

Dance therapy and dance movement psychotherapy reflect some of this approach and are each considered a study and practice within the field of somatic psychology.

Principles

As a field of study, somatic psychology has been defined as: 'the study of the mind/body interface, the relationship between our physical matter and our energy, the interaction of our body structures with our thoughts and actions.'

The primary relationship addressed in somatic psychology is the person's relation to and empathy with their own felt body. It is based on a belief, from the principles of vitalism, that bringing sufficient awareness will cause healing.

Applications

A wide variety of techniques are used in somatic psychotherapy including sound, touch, mirroring, movement and breath. An individual records life experience during a pre- and nonverbal period differently than during a verbalized and personal narrative period. Working with the client's implicit knowing of these early experiences, somatic psychology includes the non-verbal qualities that mark most human communication, especially in the first years of life. This understanding of consciousness, communication and mind-body language challenges some traditional applications of the talking cure.

Practitioners in this field believe psychological, social, cultural and political forces support the splitting and fragmentation of the mind-body unity. These pressures affect an individual’s mental, biological, and relational health. For example, the writer Alice Miller in her recent book 'The Body Never Lies' says, Ultimately the body will rebel. Even if it can be temporarily pacified with the help of drugs, cigarettes or medicine, it usually has the last word because it is quicker to see through self-deception than the mind. We may ignore or deride the messages of the body, but its rebellion demands to be heeded because its language is the authentic expression of our true selves and of the strength of our vitality.

History

Wilhelm Reich's pre-eminence as founder of the modern field is open to question. His teacher and the founder of psychoanalysis, Sigmund Freud, explored the role of body in neurosis, as well as undertaking research on the therapeutic effects of cocaine (beginning on April 24, 1884, when he ordered his first gram of cocaine from the local apothecary). Freud also showed an interest in the nasal reflex neurosis and in vital periodicity, explored during a significant relationship with Wilhelm Fliess between 1887 and 1902. Wilhelm Fliess believed that the nose was the centre of all human illness through its structural deviations to the passage of breath.

See also

 Bioenergetic analysis
 Embodied cognition
 Expressive therapy
 Focusing (psychotherapy)
 Hakomi
 Integrative body psychotherapy
 Mind–body interventions
 Mirror box
 Psychoneuroimmunology
 Psychosomatic medicine
 Research on meditation
 Rolfing (structural integration)
 Sensorimotor psychotherapy
 Somatic experiencing
 Trager approach

References

External links

 

Branches of psychology